LaTonya Sims (Tonya Sims) (born January 8, 1979) is a former American basketball player for the Polish professional basketball league(PLKK) in Europe and the WNBA. She was a back-to-back girls' high school basketball All-American and Wisconsin Gatorade Player of the Year for Racine Park High School in Racine, Wisconsin. In 1997, she was named a first team high school All-American and rated the fifth best prospect in the country, making her the highest rated girls' basketball prospect in Wisconsin to date. She was also named Miss Wisconsin Basketball and went on to play for the University of Wisconsin.

In 2003 she was signed by the Minnesota Lynx, although she did not make the opening day roster.

In 2013, she was inducted into the Racine County sports Hall of Fame.

Wisconsin statistics

Source

References

 LaTonya Sims Player Profile at wnba.com
 
 Sims Profile at University of Wisconsin-Madison Badgers site

1979 births
Living people
Sportspeople from Racine, Wisconsin
Basketball players from Wisconsin
Wisconsin Badgers women's basketball players
Sportspeople from the Milwaukee metropolitan area